328th may refer to:

328th Airlift Squadron
328th Armament Systems Wing
328th Ferrying Squadron
328th Fighter Squadron
328th Rifle Division
328th Weapons Squadron

See also
328 (number)
328, the year 328 (CCCXXVIII) of the Julian calendar
328 BC